A Passage into Forlorn is the second studio album by Canadian death metal band Neuraxis. It was released on May 11, 2001, by Neoblast Records. It was released almost four years after the band's debut and features a new line-up, with only founding members guitarist Steven Henry and bassist Yan Thiel as returning members.

Like their debut, the album was self-released through the band's own label, Neoblast Records. After the band's signing with Galy Records and Earache Records, a compilation album was released featuring both A Passage into Forlorn and Imagery remastered.

Track listing

Personnel

Neuraxis
Ian Campbell – vocals
Steven Henry – guitar, backing vocals, cover concept
Robin Milley – guitar
Yan Thiel – bass
Alex Erian – drums

Additional musician
Benji – backing vocals on track 1, 3, 7

Production
Yannick St-Amand – sound engineering
Air M.S. Studio – mixing, mastering (April 2000 – February 2001)

Additional personnel
Jason Lee Royer – artwork
Timodi – multimedia

Neuraxis (band) albums
2001 albums
Self-released albums